Road signs used by countries in the Americas are significantly influenced by the Manual on Uniform Traffic Control Devices (MUTCD), first released in 1935, reflecting the influence of the United States throughout the region. Other non-American countries using road signs similar to the MUTCD include Australia, Indonesia, Ireland, Japan, Malaysia, New Zealand, and Thailand. They, along with the US Virgin Islands, are also the only countries listed here which drive on the left—with the exception of Liberia and the Philippines (though partial), both of which drive on the right.

There are also a number of American signatories to the Vienna Convention on Road Signs and Signals: Argentina, Brazil, Chile, Cuba, Ecuador, French Guiana, Paraguay, and Suriname. Of those, only Chile, Cuba, and French Guiana have ratified the treaty.

Mandatory action signs in the Americas tend to be influenced by both systems. Nearly all countries in the Americas use yellow diamond warning signs. Recognizing the differences in standards across Europe and the Americas, the Vienna convention considers these types of signs an acceptable alternative to the triangular warning sign. However, UN compliant signs must make use of more pictograms in contrast to more text based US variants. Indeed, most American nations make use of more symbols than allowed in the US MUTCD.

Unlike in Europe, considerable variation within road sign designs can exist within nations, especially in multilingual areas.

Differences between MUTCD-influenced traffic signs 
The main differences between traffic signs influenced by the MUTCD relate to:
 Graphic design and symbological details
 The use of square-bordered or circular regulatory signs
 Local languages (signs may be bilingual or trilingual)
 Most notable is the text on stop signs. Unlike in Europe, the text on stop signs in the Americas varies depending on language, and may be multilingual.

Languages 
Below is a table of the main languages used. (In non-English speaking countries, English is frequently included on signs near airports and tourist areas.)

Differences in units 

 All countries, with the exception of the United States and the United Kingdom, use the metric system. Some countries mark this fact by using units on various signs.
 Brazil, Indonesia, Ireland, Mexico, Panama, Peru, and parts of Canada (British Columbia, parts of Ontario, and Yukon) list units (km/h) on their maximum speed limit.
 In Canada and Ireland, this is a reflection of a (somewhat) recent transition from imperial to metric, which first took effect in Canada, starting on 1 April, 1971, but its speed limit conversion didn't take full effect until September 1977. Meanwhile, in Ireland, its recent speed limit transition from miles per hour to kilometres per hour didn't take effect until 20 January 2005, although distance road signs had already been labelled in metric since the 1970s.
 The US territory of Puerto Rico uses a mixspeed limits are in mph but distance signs are marked in km.
 Advisory speed limit signs in most countries list units, although New Zealand does not. The US lists units in mph.
 Height, weight, and width restrictions are almost always accompanied by units (tonnes or metres); in the US, the short ton is used with no distinction from metric tonnes.
 Signs in some parts of Canada and Mexico near the US border often include both metric and Imperial units, to remind US drivers that they are entering metric countries. In Canada, these signs display the imperial speed limit using a Canadian-style sign, rather than an MUTCD-standard used in the US. No such equivalent exists in the US.
 The US was, at one time, planning a transition to the metric system. The Metric Conversion Act of 1975 started the process, but it was halted in 1982. The MUTCD has guidelines for posting metric versions of speed limit signs on roads.
 The SI standard unit of speed, meter per second, is not used on road signs anywhere in the world. All countries that use the metric system measure speeds in kilometers per hour.

Color differences

Warning signs 

 Nearly all MUTCD-influenced warning signs are diamond-shaped and yellow; some warning signs may be fluorescent yellow-green to draw extra attention. There are a few exceptions to this:
 Pentagonal signs are used in school zones in the United States, Liberia, Mexico, Malaysia, Thailand and many areas in Canada.  In Japan and the Philippines, pentagonal signs are permanently used for pedestrian crossings.
 Argentina employs European-style red-bordered triangular warning signs in certain instances where extra attention is required. The Philippines, Taiwan and Vietnam uses this style for most warning signs, though some highways like the Subic–Clark–Tarlac Expressway and the Manila–Cavite Expressway use MUTCD-style yellow diamond-shaped warning signs.
 Warning signs may be text-only.

Road works and construction 
 Most countries use orange diamond-shaped signs for construction zones. Australia, Cambodia, the Philippines, and sometimes Canada instead use rectangular signs that fit into temporary casings. Warnings for construction zones, however, are not marked at all in Japan and are always yellow.
 In the USA, Canada, Australia, Thailand, Taiwan, and the Philippines the temporary Road Closed sign is instead always a rectangular sign that can either be used as a standalone or fit into a temporary casing.

Regulatory signs 
 Prohibitory and restrictive signs are classified as regulatory signs, as per the MUTCD.
 Almost all prohibitory signs use a red circle with a slash. Restrictive signs typically use a red circle, as in Europe. Some may be seated on a rectangular white background.
 The original MUTCD prohibitory and restrictive signs were text-only (i.e. NO LEFT TURN). Some of these signs continue to be used in the US.
 The No Entry / Do Not Enter sign may or may not feature text. In some Latin American countries, an upwards-pointing arrow contained within a slashed red circle is used instead. Some countries have those two signs separated.
 The Latin American-style 'do not proceed straight' sign may take a different meaning in countries with standard No Entry / Do Not Enter signs. Typically, it indicates an intersection where traffic cannot continue straight ahead (often involving a one-way street to be exact), but where cross-traffic may enter the street from the right (or left). Thus, it is distinguished from a No Entry / Do Not Enter (for all vehicles) sign.

Mandatory or permitted-action signs 

 The design of mandatory signs varies widely, since the MUTCD does not specify their use. Rather, the MUTCD's equivalent are classified as regulatory signs.
 Some countries use simple arrows with the text "ONLY" or its equivalent underneath. This is the MUTCD standard.
 Some countries use European-style white-on-blue circular signs. These are "Type A Mandatory Signs" as prescribed by the Vienna Convention.
 Some Latin American countries (and formerly Thailand) use red-bordered circular signs, in the same style as regulatory signs. These are "Type B Mandatory Signs" as prescribed by the Vienna Convention. In cases relating to particular types of vehicle traffic (e.g. buses), these signs are identical to some European prohibitory signs.
 Canada uses a unique style of mandatory sign that features a green circle.

Highway and wayfinding signs 
 Most countries use white-on-green signs on highways and to indicate location, etc.
 The exact style of these signs varies widely, although many are influenced by the MUTCD standard.
 Chile, Ireland, Japan, and New Zealand use both white-on-green and white-on-blue guide signs, as does the Northwest Territories and Ontario in Canada.
 Malaysia uses both black-on-yellow and white-on-green guide signs.
 White-on-blue signs are sometimes used at airports and for rest areas.
 White-on-brown signs are sometimes used to indicate park areas.

Gallery of guide signs

Table of traffic signs comparison

Warning

Regulatory

Mandatory or permitted actions

Other (indication)

See also 

 Comparison of European road signs
 Comparison of traffic signs in English-speaking territories
 Glossary of road transport terms
 Manual on Uniform Traffic Control Devices
 Traffic sign
 Vienna Convention on Road Signs and Signals

Notes

References 

Street furniture
MUTCD
Manual on Uniform Traffic Control Devices
Comparisons